Richard Rondeau (December 18, 1921 – January 18, 1989) was an American ice hockey player.  Born in Providence, Rhode Island, Rondeau played his college hockey at Dartmouth College and was a member of the 1942 NCAA championship team.  The team won 21 games and lost 2, while Rondeau led the nation in scoring with 45 goals and 32 assists. Dartmouth would go on to win 41 straight games over a 4-year period. Rondeau captained the 1943 team as well, and also served as coach when Coach Eddie Jeremiah entered the Navy in mid-season.  He was captain again in 1944.  Over his four-year college career Rondeau shattered nearly all of the school's scoring records, tallying 103 goals and 73 assists for an average 4.4 points per game. Rondeau still holds eight Collegiate Ice Hockey records, including most goals and assists in one game (12 goals, 11 assists), however, because he played before NCAA sponsorship, none of his marks are currently recognized nationally. Signed by The Boston Bruins, Rondeau's professional career was cut short due to an accident during military service. Rondeau played professionally in the Pacific Coast Hockey League for the San Diego Skyhawks and later the Atlantic Hockey League for the New Haven Bears prior to leaving for active duty in The Pacific.  He was inducted into the United States Hockey Hall of Fame in 1985. He died in Dallas, Texas in 1989. Rondeau was inducted as a charter member of the Rhode Island Hockey Hall of Fame in 2018.

Statistics

Regular season and playoffs

Head coaching record

† Rondeau shared interim coaching duties with the football team's assistant coach George T. Barclay.

References

External links
 
 Dick Rondeau U.S. Hockey Hall of Fame

1921 births
1989 deaths
American men's ice hockey centers
Boston Olympics players
Dartmouth Big Green men's ice hockey players
Ice hockey people from Providence, Rhode Island
Providence Friars men's ice hockey coaches
United States Hockey Hall of Fame inductees